Jo-Wilfried Tsonga was the defending champion, but was eliminated in the first round by Jarkko Nieminen.
Top seed Rafael Nadal defeated Gaël Monfils 6–1, 7–5 to become the event's third Spanish winner since David Ferrer won in 2007.

Seeds

Draw

Finals

Top half

Bottom half

Qualifying

Seeds

Qualifiers

Draw

First qualifier

Second qualifier

Third qualifier

Fourth qualifier

External links
Main draw
Qualifying draw

Rakuten Japan Open Tennis Championships - Singles